Heliocheilus fumata is a moth in the family Noctuidae. It is endemic to Queensland.

External links
Australian Faunal Directory

Heliocheilus
Moths of Australia